Adolf Żytogórski (or Adolph Zytogorski, later known as John Hanstein) ( – 28 February 1882) was a Polish-British chess master and translator.

Biography 
Details of Zytogorski's early life are sparse. He is usually said to have been born in 1806 or 1807 based on his obituary in the British Chess Magazine, but according to chess historian Tim Harding, around 1811 or 1812 is most likely, based on his census records and death certificate. Despite being Polish, he gave his place of birth on census records as Transylvania, which was part of the Austrian Empire at the time, leading Harding to speculate that he may have had one Polish and one Austrian parent.

Following the collapse of the Polish–Russian War in 1830–31 (November Uprising), Zytogorski became a political refugee, and emigrated to England. His role in the uprising is unknown, but in 1837 he joined both the Union of Polish Emigration, and the Polish Democratic Society. During Nicholas I of Russia's 1844 visit to London, Zytogorski and other exiles were offered an amnesty, but Zytogorski did not accept, and remained in England.

From about 1850 he adopted the surname Hanstein (possibly his mother's maiden name), though he kept using the name Zytogorski for chess.

Zytogorski died on 28 February 1882 in the German Hospital, Dalston, London.

Chess 
Zytogorski was a frequent contributor to the Chess Player's Chronicle, and in 1841 carried out a thorough analysis of the Rook and bishop versus rook endgame, including a challenge that four starting positions could always be won, including one said by Giambattista Lolli to be a draw. Much of this work was included in Howard Staunton's Chess-Players' Handbook (1847) with analysis by Josef Kling, who showed that there was an error in Zytogorski's logic.

From 1859 to 1862, Zytogorski, Ignatz Kolisch, and Josef Kling revived the Chess Player's Chronicle, which had been discontinued by R. B. Brien in 1856. Zytogorski's role is not clear, but in 1861 it was reported that it would "henceforth be edited by Herr Kolisch conjointly with its late manager Mr. Zytogorski".

Zytogorski won a match against Franciscus Janssens (6:4) in 1854, took second behind Ernst Falkbeer and ahead of Brien in 1855 (Triangular), and lost to Valentine Green (7:8) in 1856 (Zytogorski gave odds of pawn and move).
 
He won at London 1855 (Kling's Coffee House), played in semifinals at London 1856 (McDonnell Chess Club), and lost to Ignaz von Kolisch at Cambridge 1860 (semifinal).

Bibliography 
As editor:
 Chess Player's Chronicle (1859–1862)

As translator:
 Select Popular Tales from the German of Musaeus (1845) (anonymous) by Johann Karl August Musäus
 The Enchanted Knights; or The Chronicle of the Three Sisters (1845) (anonymous) by Johann Karl August Musäus
 The Nymph of the Well and The Barber's Ghost (1848) (as Adolphus Zytogorski) by Johann Karl August Musäus
 Libussa, Duchess of Bohemia; also The Man Without a Name (1852) (as Adolphus Zytogorski, later reissued as J. T. Hanstein) by Johann Karl August Musäus
 Oswald Dorn (1856) (as J. F. Hanstein) by Carl Franz van der Velde
 The Immaculate Conception (1857) (as J. F. Hanstein) by Edmond de Pressensé
 The Captain's Daughter (1859) (as J. F. Hanstein) by Alexander Sergeyevich Pushkin
 Popular Works of Musæus (1865) (as J. T. Hanstein) by Johann Karl August Musäus
 The Chronicle of the Three Sisters, and Mute Love (1866) (as J. T. Hanstein) by Johann Karl August Musäus

Notes

References

Further reading 
 British Chess Magazine, 1882, p. 141
 Chess Monthly, 1881–82, p. 236
 Chess Player's Chronicle, 1882, p. 126
 Deutsche Schachzeitung, 1882, p. 141

External links 

 
 
 
 Zytogórski, Adolf player profile at Edo Historical Chess Ratings

19th-century births
1882 deaths
Polish chess players
British chess players
Place of birth missing
Polish expatriates in the United Kingdom
19th-century chess players
Polish translators
19th-century British translators
German–English translators
French–English translators
Russian–English translators
Literary translators
Translators of Alexander Pushkin
Polish magazine editors
British magazine editors
Managing editors